Mary Thompson may refer to:
Mary Thompson (businesswoman), African American saloon and brothel owner
Mary Anne Thompson (1776–1852), mistress of Frederick, Duke of York
Mary C. Thompson (died 2001), Dean of Damavand College in Tehran
Mary Clark Thompson (1835–1923), philanthropist and wife of banker Frederick Ferris Thompson
Mary E. Thompson, Canadian statistician
Mary Elizabeth Thompson (1855–1953), American prostitute and dance hall girl
Te Ata Fisher (1895–1995), born Mary Frances Thompson
Mary Gabrielle Thompson (born 1948), Australian politician
Mary Harris Thompson (1829–1895), founder, head physician and surgeon of the Chicago Hospital for Women and Children
Mary Jean Thompson, American honorary consul
Mary Wilson Thompson, Delaware civic leader

See also
Mary Thompson-Jones,  senior Foreign Service Officer in the United States' Department of State
Mary Thomson (disambiguation)
Thompson (disambiguation)